The Safad Subdistrict was  one of the subdistricts of Mandatory Palestine before it was captured by Israel in 1948. It was located around the city of Safad. After the 1948 Arab-Israeli War, the subdistrict, which fell entirely within modern-day Israel, became the modern-day Safed Subdistrict in the Northern District (Israel).

Borders
 Acre Subdistrict (South West)
 Tiberias Subdistrict (South)
 Lebanon (North)
 Syria (East)

Depopulated towns and villages

(current localities in parentheses)

 Abil al-Qamh (Yuval)
 al-'Abisiyya 
 'Akbara
 Alma (Alma)
 Ammuqa ('Ammuqa)
 Arab al-Shamalina (Almaghor)
 Arab al-Zubayd 
 Baysamun
 Biriyya (Birya)
 al-Butayha (Almaghor)
 al-Buwayziyya 
 Dallata (Dalton)
 al-Dawwara ('Ammir, Sde Necheyma)
 Dayshum (Dishon)
 al-Dirbashiyya 
 al-Dirdara
 Ein al-Zeitun
 Fara
 Farradiyya (Parod, Shefer)
 Fir'im (Chatzor HagGlilit)
 Ghabbatiyya
 Ghuraba
 al-Hamra' 
 Harrawi 
 Hunin (Margaliyot)
 al-Husayniyya (Haluta, Sde Eliezer)

 Jahula 
 al-Ja'una (Rosh Pinna)
 Jubb Yusuf ('Ammi'ad)
 Kafr Bir'im (Bar'am, Dovev)
 al-Khalisa (Kiryat Shemona)
 Khan al-Duwayr (Amnun)
 Khirbat Karraza 
 al-Khisas (HagGoshrim)
 Khiyam al-Walid (Lehavot HabBashan)
 Kirad al-Baqqara (Gadot, Mishmar HayYarden)
 Kirad al-Ghannama (Ayelet HashShachar, Gadot)
 Lazzaza 
 Madahil 
 Al-Malkiyya (Malkiya)
 Mallaha 
 al-Manshiyya 
 al-Mansura (Shear Yashuv)
 Mansurat al-Khayt 
 Marus 
 Meiron (Meyron)
 al-Muftakhira (Shamir)
 Mughr al-Khayt (Chatzor HagGlilit, Rosh Pinna)
 Khirbat al-Muntar 
 al-Nabi Yusha' (Ramot Naftali)
 al-Na'ima (Beyt Hillel, Kfar Blum, Neot Mordechai)
 Qabba'a

 Qadas (Malkiya, Ramot Naftali, Yiftah)
 Qaddita 
 Qaytiyya
 al-Qudayriyya
 al-Ras al-Ahmar (Kerem Ben Zimra)
 Sabalan 
 Safsaf (Bar Yohay, Kfar Hoshen) 
 Saliha (Avirim, Yir'im)
 al-Salihiyya 
 al-Sammu'i 
 al-Sanbariyya (Dafta, Mayan Barukh)
 Sa'sa' (Sasa)
 Safad (Safed)
 al-Shawka al-Tahta 
 al-Shuna
 Taytaba
 Tulayl
 al-'Ulmaniyya
 al-'Urayfiyya 
 al-Wayziyya
 Yarda (Ayelet HashShachar, Mishmar HayYarden)
 al-Zahiriyya al-Tahta 
 al-Zanghariyya (Elifelet, Kare Deshe)
 al-Zawiya (Neot Mordechai)
 al-Zuq al-Fawqani (Yuval)
 al-Zuq al-Tahtani (Beyt Hillel)

1920 establishments in Mandatory Palestine
1948 disestablishments in Mandatory Palestine
Subdistricts of Mandatory Palestine